Alvin Ashley (born October 14, 1969) is a former American football wide receiver in the Arena Football League. He played college football at Southwest Minnesota State.

Ashley played for the Milwaukee Mustangs, Miami Hooters, Albany Firebirds, Minnesota Fighting Pike, New Jersey Red Dogs, New Jersey Gladiators, Tampa Bay Storm, Carolina Cobras, and Grand Rapids Rampage.

External links
Just Sports Stats

1969 births
Living people
American football wide receivers
American football cornerbacks
American football safeties
Milwaukee Mustangs (1994–2001) players
Miami Hooters players
Albany Firebirds players
Minnesota Fighting Pike players
New Jersey Red Dogs players
New Jersey Gladiators players
Tampa Bay Storm players
Carolina Cobras players
Grand Rapids Rampage players
Southwest Minnesota State Mustangs football players